CA-74 may refer to:

, a United States Navy Baltimore-class heavy cruiser
California State Route 74, a highway in southern California